Perspective may refer to:

Vision and mathematics
 Perspectivity, the formation of an image in a picture plane of a scene viewed from a fixed point, and its modeling in geometry

 Perspective (graphical), representing the effects of visual perspective in graphic arts
 Aerial perspective, the effect the atmosphere has on the appearance of an object as it is viewed from a distance
 Perspective distortion (photography), the way that viewing a picture from the wrong position gives a perceived distortion
 Perspective (geometry), a relation between geometric figures
 Vue d'optique or perspective view, a genre of etching popular during the second half of the 18th century and into the 19th.

Entertainment
 Perspective (P-Model album), 1982
 Perspective (America album), 1984
 Perspective (Jason Becker album), 1996
 Perspective (Lawson album), 2016
 Perspective, a 2010 album by Prague
 Perspective (EP), an EP by Tesseract
 Perspectives (album), the 2010 album by Australian band House Vs. Hurricane
 "Perspectives", a song from the album Sea of Faces by Kutless
 Perspective Records, a record label
 Perspective (film series), a 2012-2020 film series by B. P. Paquette
Perspective (2019 film), an adult romance drama
 Perspective (video game), a puzzle game
 Perspectives (TV series), a British arts documentary series

Other
 Perspective (pharmacoeconomic), the vantage point from which a pharmacoeconomics analysis is conducted
 Point of view (literature), the related experience of the narrator
 Point of view (philosophy), in philosophy and psychology, the context for opinions, beliefs and experiences
 Perspectives on Political Science, peer-reviewed academic journal
 The Perspective, a news and history website

See also
 Perspecta, a motion picture sound system 
 Perspectivism, in philosophy
 Point of view (disambiguation)